Jonathan Nichols may refer to:
 Jonathan Nichols (Rhode Island politician) (1681–1727), colonial deputy governor of Rhode Island
 Jonathan Nichols (American football) (born 1981), former placekicker
 Jonathan Nichols (Oklahoma politician) (1965–2019), Republican United States politician from the U.S. state of Oklahoma
 Jonathan Nichols Jr. (1712–1756), deputy governor of the Colony of Rhode Island and Providence Plantations
 Jon Nichols (born 1981), English footballer